The Pedestals of Biahmu (also spelled Biyahmū) are the basal remnants of two colossal statues erected by the ancient Egyptian pharaoh Amenemhat III. The actual statues were long ago destroyed and today only their bases have survived.

Name

The pedestals are known by a variety of names, including the "Colossi of Biahmu" and the "Pyramids of Biahmu". Historically, the ruins have also been called  ("Pyramid of Biahmu"),   ("The Foot of the Pharaoh"), and Mustuhamel ("The Bathed").

History

The first mention of the statues can be found in the work of the Greek historian Herodotus ( 5th century BC), who claims in his Histories that "in the centre [of Lake Moeris] there stand two pyramids, rising to the height of fifty fathoms above the surface of the water, and extending as far beneath, crowned each of them with a colossal statue sitting upon a throne." Herodotus's claim that the statues towered "fifty fathoms" above the lake is almost certainly "grossly inflated". Additionally, given the impracticality of building pyramids in water, the British Egyptologist William Matthew Flinders Petrie hypothesizes that Herodotus wrote of these statues during a time that the area had flooded. Claims similar to those made by Herodotus were later repeated by Diodorus the Sicilian ( 1st century BC) and Pliny the Elder (AD 23/24 – 79).

In 1245, the Arabic writer Abu Osman el-Nabulsi el-Safadi reported that the tops of both statues had been partially destroyed in the search for supposed treasures. In 1672, the theologian Johann Michael Vansleb wrote that he could only make out the remains of one of the two statues, and by the time the English travel writer Richard Pococke visited the site in 1737, only the bases remained. In the 19th century, William Matthew Flinders Petrie studied the site, as did Labib Habachi in the 1940s. On the plinths were carved representations of the 42 nomes (territorial divisions) of ancient Egypt. The statues once stood on a causeway flanking Lake Moeris. Between them was a road that led to the ancient city of Arsinoe (i.e., Crocodilopolis).

References 

Amenemhat III
Ancient Egypt
Faiyum
Colossal statues in Egypt